Pilao is a village in Hsawlaw Township in Myitkyina District in the Kachin State of north-eastern Burma.

Populated places in Kachin State
Hsawlaw Township

External links
Satellite map at Maplandia.com

Pilao Labs